James Ross Johnson (September 28, 1939 – August 16, 2017) was an American politician and lawyer. He was the first person in the California Legislature to become his party's leader in both the State Assembly and State Senate.

From Irvine, California, Johnson went to California State University, Fullerton and Western State College of Law. He practiced law. Johnson served in the California State Assembly from 1978 to 1995 and then served in the California State Senate from 1995 to 2004. Johnson was involved with the Republican Party. From 2007 to 2010, Johnson served as the chair of the California Fair Political Practices Commission.

On August 16, 2017, Johnson died of cancer in Sacramento, California at the age of 77.

References

External links
Join California Ross Johnson

1939 births
2017 deaths
People from Irvine, California
California State University, Fullerton alumni
Western State University College of Law alumni
California lawyers
Republican Party California state senators
Republican Party members of the California State Assembly
21st-century American politicians
Deaths from cancer in California
20th-century American lawyers